Benedict T. Casnocha is an American author, entrepreneur, and investor, based in San Francisco, California.

He is currently the co-founder and partner at the venture capital firm Village Global.

At 14 he founded Comcate Inc., an e-government technology firm, and is the author of three books, including the New York Times bestseller The Start-Up of You.

He is a keynote speaker at many business events and conventions. He has appeared on The Charlie Rose Show and is a commentator on NPR’s Marketplace and in Newsweek. He has also written for the American Enterprise Institute and the U.S. State Department. He has been a mentor at startup incubator Techstars.

In 2006, BusinessWeek named Casnocha one of America's best young entrepreneurs. Politics Online named him one of the "25 most influential people in the world of internet and politics."

In 2017, A member of Product Hunt 's founding team and a veteran from LinkedIn are teaming up to invest in companies at the early stage. For a new investment fund Erik Torenberg and Ben Casnocha are investing $50 million.

Books

My Start-Up Life
My Start-Up Life: What a (Very) Young CEO Learned on his Journey Through Silicon Valley was published on May 25, 2007, by Jossey-Bass. It recounts Casnocha’s founding of an e-government technology firm, Comcate.

The Start-Up of You
The Start-Up of You: Adapt to the Future, Invest In Yourself and Transform Your Career is Casnocha's second book. It is co-authored with Reid Hoffman, co-founder and Executive Chairman of professional social networking website LinkedIn and was released in the United States on February 14, 2012.

The Alliance
The Alliance: Managing Talent in the Networked Age is Casnocha's third book. It is co-authored with investor Chris Yeh and Reid Hoffman and was released in the United States on July 8, 2014.

References

External links

Interview with Ben Casnocha on Notebook on Cities and Culture

American businesspeople
Living people
1988 births